Lomatium cusickii (Cusick's biscuitroot) is a perennial herb of the family Apiaceae. Its range is in the Northwestern United States. Its native habitats include well-drained meadows, ridges, slopes, and conifer forests.

References

External links
 USDA Plants Profile for Lomatium cusickii (Cusick's biscuitroot, Cusick's desert-parsley)

cusickii
Flora of the Northwestern United States
Endemic flora of the United States
Taxa named by John Merle Coulter
Flora without expected TNC conservation status